Jesús Rafael Tavárez Alcántaras (born March 26, 1971) is a Dominican former professional baseball outfielder and current manager of the Dominican Summer League Guardians Blue, a Rookie-level affiliate of the Cleveland Guardians. He played five seasons in Major League Baseball, playing mainly in center field for three different teams from - seasons. He also played two seasons for the Haitai Tigers of the KBO League. Listed at 6' 0", 170 lb., he was a switch-hitter and threw right-handed. 
 
Tavárez entered the majors in 1994 with the Florida Marlins, playing for them three years before joining the Boston Red Sox (1997) and Baltimore Orioles (1998). His most productive season came in 1995 with the Marlins, when he posted career-numbers in batting average (.289), home runs (2), runs (31), RBI (13) and stolen bases (7). The next season, he appeared in a career-high 98 games, while hitting just .219.

In a five-season career, Tavárez was a .239 hitter (101-for-228) with three home runs and 33 RBI in 228 games, including 12 doubles, three triples and 13 stolen bases. He also played in the Seattle, Florida, Boston, Baltimore and San Francisco minor league systems from 1990–99, hitting .274 with 22 home runs and 259 RBI in 741 games.

See also
Players from Dominican Republic in Major League Baseball

External links

Korea Baseball Organization

1971 births
Living people
Águilas Cibaeñas players
Baltimore Orioles players
Boston Red Sox players
Charlotte Knights players
Dominican Republic expatriate baseball players in Mexico
Dominican Republic expatriate baseball players in South Korea
Dominican Republic expatriate baseball players in the United States
Florida Marlins players
Fresno Grizzlies players
Haitai Tigers players
High Desert Mavericks players
Jacksonville Suns players
Major League Baseball outfielders
Major League Baseball players from the Dominican Republic
Mexican League baseball center fielders
Mexican League baseball right fielders
Minor league baseball managers
Pawtucket Red Sox players
Peninsula Pilots players
Portland Sea Dogs players
Rochester Red Wings players
Rojos del Águila de Veracruz players
San Bernardino Spirit players
Tigres del Licey players